Jair Francoise Jurrjens (born January 29, 1986) is a Curaçaoan professional baseball pitcher for the Acereros de Monclova of the Mexican League. He has played in Major League Baseball (MLB) for the Detroit Tigers, Atlanta Braves (with whom he was an All Star in 2011), Baltimore Orioles, and Colorado Rockies, and in the Chinese Professional Baseball League (CPBL) for the Uni-President 7-Eleven Lions. He pitched for Team Netherlands in the 2017 World Baseball Classic.

Childhood
Jurrjens was named after the Biblical judge Jair by his mother Esther. She and Jurrjens' father, Carl, have two other children, Carl, Jr. and Charlotte.

In 2002, Jurrjens' Curaçao Senior League team won the Senior League World Series in Bangor, Maine.

Jurrjens speaks English, Spanish, Dutch and Papiamentu.

Professional career

Detroit Tigers
Jurrjens was signed as an undrafted free agent by the Detroit Tigers in 2003. In seven games during his 2003 campaign with the GCL Tigers, Jurrjens accumulated a 2–1 record with 20 strikeouts and just three walks.

However, Jurrjens really broke out during his 2005 season with the West Michigan Whitecaps, the Tigers' single-A affiliate. In 26 games started, Jurrjens went 12–6 with 108 strikeouts and 36 walks. He was a mid-season Midwest League All Star with West Michigan.

He continued to improve during the 2006 season, beginning with a 5–0, 2.08 ERA start with the Lakeland Tigers that resulted in him being named to the Florida State League mid-season All Star team. Jurrjens was promoted to the Erie SeaWolves, the Tigers' Double-A affiliate. In 12 games with the SeaWolves, Jurrjens went 4–3 with a 3.36 ERA.

Jurrjens began the 2007 season pitching for the SeaWolves. On August 6, he was named Pitcher of the Week. On August 15, the Tigers purchased Jurrjens' contract from the SeaWolves, adding him to their 40-man roster. Jurrjens made his major league debut on August 15, 2007, as a starting pitcher against the Cleveland Indians, making him the first pitcher from Curaçao to reach the major leagues. In that game, he gave up four earned runs in seven innings, taking the loss. He recorded his first major league win in his next start, also against the Indians, allowing only one run on one hit in  innings pitched.

2006 World Baseball Classic
Jurrjens joined fellow Curaçao native Andruw Jones on the Netherlands national baseball team for the 2006 World Baseball Classic. Jurrjens pitched one inning against Puerto Rico in the WBC, giving up three runs and earning him a loss.

Atlanta Braves
On October 29, 2007, Jurrjens and outfielder Gorkys Hernandez were traded to the Atlanta Braves for shortstop Édgar Rentería. Jurrjens was listed by Baseball America as the Braves' 3rd-best prospect entering the 2008 season.

By the end of April 2008, Jurrjens was 3–2 with a 3.05 ERA and 28 strikeouts. Jurrjens was asked prior to the game on April 20 about how he felt facing his fellow countryman Andruw Jones. Jurrjens said, "It's going to be fun to face him", then said "It's going to be even more fun to strike him out." Jurrjens then went on to strike Jones out all three times he faced him.

Jurrjens pitched well throughout the first half of the 2008 season, compiling a 9–4 record with an impressive 3.00 ERA prior to the All-Star Break. On July 9, 2008 Jurrjens was named National League Rookie of the Month for the month of June. Jurrjens appeared to tire during the second half of the season, going 4–6 with a subpar 4.66 ERA after the All-Star Break. Overall, Jurrjens finished his rookie season with a record of 13–10 and a 3.68 ERA in 188 innings.

Jurrjens finished third in voting for the 2008 NL Rookie of the Year award. Jurrjens lost the award to Geovany Soto with Joey Votto finishing second.

Despite his impressive rookie season, some remained skeptical of Jurrjens' future prospects as a pitcher in the major leagues. As a result, Jurrjens went into the 2009 season looking to avoid a "sophomore slump."

Jurrjens again pitched very well in the first half of 2009, going just 7–7 but posting an excellent 2.91 ERA in 19 starts. Unlike 2008, there was no drop-off in the second half for Jurrjens, as he went 7–3 with an exceptional 2.24 ERA in 15 second-half starts. He was named Pitcher of the Month in September. Overall in 2009, Jurrjens went 14–10 while finishing third in the National League with a 2.60 ERA in 215 innings and tying for the league lead with 34 games started. Jurrjens went 7–6 with a 4.64 ERA in 2010, a season in which he dealt with some health problems. He underwent arthroscopic surgery for a torn meniscus in his right knee in October, having missed September and the Division Series with pain in his knee.

Jurrjens began the 2011 season on the disabled list, but got off to a strong start after he was activated. He was named Pitcher of the Month in May. He pitched his first career shutout on July 1, 2011 against the Baltimore Orioles, allowing one hit and one walk. It was his eleventh win of the season and improved his ERA to a league-best 1.89 ERA. Jurrjens led the National League in wins and ERA at the All-Star break, and was chosen to play in his first All-Star Game. He pitched 1 scoreless innings in the NL's 5–1 win. Following the All-Star break, Jurrjens went 0–1 with a 6.26 ERA in four starts. On August 6, the Braves placed him on the 15-day DL due to pain in his surgically repaired right knee. The move was retroactive to August 2. He returned briefly, but did not play for the Braves in September.

Jurrjens got off to a poor start in the 2012 season, while suffering from a strained groin, with an 0–2 record and a 9.37 ERA in his first four starts. On April 23, he was optioned to the Braves' Triple-A affiliate in Gwinnett, his first demotion in five seasons with the Braves. Atlanta's general manager, Frank Wren, stated that the move was intended to give Jurrjens the opportunity to work through his difficulties at the Triple-A level and get back on track pitching wise.

On June 22, 2012, Jurrjens was called back to the majors by the Braves after teammate Brandon Beachy injured his right elbow and underwent Tommy John surgery. He got his first win of the 2012 season against the Boston Red Sox. For the season, he posted a 6.89 ERA.  He was not tendered a contract before the deadline on November 30, 2012, and became a free agent.

Baltimore Orioles
On January 24, 2013, Jurrjens agreed to a one-year deal with the Baltimore Orioles for $1.5 million. Incentives could have brought the deal to $4 million. However, after the Orioles reviewed Jurrjens' medical information, they instead signed Jurrjens to a minor league contract. Jurrjen's contract was purchased from the Triple-A Norfolk Tides on May 18. He made his first start with the Orioles on that day, pitching 5 innings and picking up a no-decision, while the Orioles lost the game 6-10. He was optioned back to the Norfolk Tides on May 21, and recalled on June 29. He was optioned back to Norfolk on July 1. Jurrjens was designated for assignment by the Orioles on July 12 in order to clear room for Jairo Asencio. Jurrjens opted for free agency instead of playing in Triple A, and became a free agent on July 18.

Return to Detroit organization
On July 24, 2013, Jurrjens was signed to a minor league deal bringing him back to Detroit. Jurrjens was quickly optioned to the Triple-A Toledo Mud Hens.

Cincinnati Reds organization
On May 20, 2014, Jurrjens signed a minor league deal with the Cincinnati Reds. In 2014, he was 2-3 with a 4.46 ERA for the AAA Louisville Bats.

Colorado Rockies
On July 2, 2014, Jurrjens was traded to the Colorado Rockies in exchange for minor league first baseman Harold Riggins. Jurrjens made his 2014 season debut on July 4, making his first major league start since June 29, 2013, pitching  innings and allowing eight runs on 12 hits. After the start, Jurrjens was taken to the hospital, though his "breathing problem" had since ceased. He said "It was super scary. Every time I needed to take a deep breath, I couldn't do it." Rockies manager Walt Weiss said the altitude may have affected Jurrjens in his first appearance."

He was designated for assignment on July 21, and was resigned to a minor league contract. In 2014, he was 0-1 with a 10.61 ERA for the Rockies in two starts, and 0-5 with a 4.60 ERA for the AAA Colorado Springs Sky Sox in eight starts.

Jurrjens elected free agency in October 2014, but was resigned by the Rockies to a minor league deal and began 2015 with the Rockies AAA affiliate the Albuquerque Isotopes. He was released by the Rockies on August 28, 2015 after posting a 2-5 record and a 6.88 ERA in 17 games for the Isotopes.

Uni-President 7-Eleven Lions
Jurrjens signed with the Uni-President 7-Eleven Lions of the Chinese Professional Baseball League on February 13, 2016. He was on the disabled list twice, once with a groin injury, and was 6-7 with a 5.38 ERA. He was released in August.

Los Angeles Dodgers
On March 29, 2017, he signed a minor league contract with the Los Angeles Dodgers and was assigned to the Triple-A Oklahoma City Dodgers to begin the season. He appeared in 11 games (10 starts) for Oklahoma City and was 4–3 with a 4.64 ERA. On June 15, 2017, he was suspended 80 games for testing positive for exogenous testosterone. On November 6, 2017, he elected free agency.

Jurrjens signed with the Tigres Del Licey in the Dominican Winter League for the 2017/18 season.

Long Island Ducks
On March 7, 2018, Jurrjens signed with the Long Island Ducks of the independent Atlantic League of Professional Baseball. In 9 appearances for the Ducks, Jurrjens logged a 3-3 record and 3.55 ERA with 32 strikeouts in 50.2 innings of work. He became a free agent following the 2018 season.

Mexican League
On December 20, 2019, Jurrjens signed with the Algodoneros de Unión Laguna of the Mexican League for the 2020 season. Jurrjens did not play in a game in 2020 due to the cancellation of the Mexican League season because of the COVID-19 pandemic. He later became a free agent.

On June 7, 2021, Jurrjens signed with the Guerreros de Oaxaca of the Mexican League. He made 7 starts, going 3-1 with a 4.26 ERA and 25 strikeouts in 38 innings. Jurrjens became a free agent following the season.

On May 17, 2022, Jurrjens signed with the Saraperos de Saltillo of the Mexican League. However, he was released on May 25, 2022, without making an official appearance for the team.

On July 1, 2022, Jurrjens signed with the Acereros de Monclova of the Mexican League.

International career
Jurrjens played for Team Netherlands in the 2017 World Baseball Classic.

Pitching repertoire
Jurrjens has a four-seam fastball currently at 91–92 MPH. Jurrjens pairs his fastball with a changeup to lefties in the low 80s and a slurve in the high 70s to righties.

References

External links

Jair Jurrjens CPBL statistics and profile

1986 births
2006 World Baseball Classic players
2015 WBSC Premier12 players
2017 World Baseball Classic players
Albuquerque Isotopes players
Atlanta Braves players
Baltimore Orioles players
Colorado Rockies players
Curaçao baseball players
Curaçao expatriate baseball players in Mexico
Curaçao expatriate baseball players in Taiwan
Curaçao expatriate baseball players in the United States
Detroit Tigers players
Dutch people of Curaçao descent
Erie SeaWolves players
Guerreros de Oaxaca players
Gulf Coast Tigers players
Gwinnett Braves players
Lakeland Tigers players
Living people
Long Island Ducks players
Louisville Bats players
Major League Baseball players from Curaçao
Major League Baseball pitchers
National League All-Stars
Norfolk Tides players
Oneonta Tigers players
People from Willemstad
Papiamento-speaking people
Tigres del Licey players
Curaçao expatriate baseball players in the Dominican Republic
Toledo Mud Hens players
West Michigan Whitecaps players
Oklahoma City Dodgers players